Spathelia coccinea is a species of plant in the family Rutaceae. It is endemic to Jamaica.  It is threatened by habitat loss.

References

Flora of Jamaica
coccinea
Critically endangered plants
Endemic flora of Jamaica
Taxonomy articles created by Polbot